Jonathan Erdmann (born 12 March 1988 in Potsdam) is a German beach volleyball player. He competed for Germany at the 2012 Summer Olympics.

References

1988 births
Living people
German men's beach volleyball players
Beach volleyball players at the 2012 Summer Olympics
Olympic beach volleyball players of Germany
Sportspeople from Potsdam